The Rugby Rural District was a former rural district in Warwickshire, England. The district covered the rural areas surrounding the town of Rugby, where the district council was based, but did not include Rugby itself which was administered separately.

The district was created in 1894. In 1932 its boundaries were significantly altered. The district was expanded to include the whole of the abolished Monks Kirby Rural District, parts of the abolished Foleshill Rural District and parts of the abolished Nuneaton Rural District. It also briefly included Bulkington, but in 1938 this merged with the Bedworth Urban District. At the same time it lost some territory as Rugby's town boundaries were expanded.

On 1 April 1974 the district was abolished and merged with the Rugby municipal borough (which covered the town of Rugby) to form the present Borough of Rugby.

Parishes

At the time of its abolition in 1974 Rugby RD consisted of the following civil parishes:

 Ansty
 Binley Woods
 Birdingbury
 Bourton and Draycote
 Brandon and Bretford
 Brinklow
 Burton Hastings
 Church Lawford
 Churchover
 Clifton upon Dunsmore
 Combe Fields
 Copston Magna
 Cosford
 Dunchurch
 Easenhall
 Frankton
 Grandborough
 Harborough Magna
 King's Newnham (Newnham Regis)
 Leamington Hastings
 Little Lawford
 Long Lawford
 Marton
 Monks Kirby
 Newton and Biggin
 Pailton
 Princethorpe
 Ryton on Dunsmore
 Shilton
 Stretton Baskerville
 Stretton-on-Dunsmore
 Stretton-under-Fosse
 Thurlaston
 Wibtoft
 Willey
 Willoughby
 Withybrook
 Wolfhampcote
 Wolston
 Wolvey

External links
VisionofBritain – Used as reference

History of Warwickshire
Local government in Warwickshire
Districts of England created by the Local Government Act 1894
Districts of England abolished by the Local Government Act 1972
Rural districts of England